"Illegal Life" is the debut single by American hip hop duo Capone-N-Noreaga, released in 1996. The song is from their 1997 debut album, The War Report, and features guest appearances from fellow American rappers Havoc and Tragedy Khadafi, both of which also produced the song.

Charts

Peak positions

References

1996 debut singles
1996 songs
Capone-N-Noreaga songs
Songs written by Havoc (musician)
Songs written by N.O.R.E.